25 Year Celebration of Mannheim Steamroller is a two-disc anthology album released by new-age musical group Mannheim Steamroller in 1999, in honor of the group's 25th anniversary.

Track listing

Disc 1
"The Steamroller" (Fresh Aire 8) – 4:38
"Morning" (Fresh Aire III) – 2:56
"Baroque-A-Nova" (Classical Gas) – 3:07
"Christmas Lullaby" (Christmas in the Aire) – 4:06
"Four Rows of Jacks" (Fresh Aire IV) – 3:13
"Chocolate Coffee" (Sunday Morning Coffee II) – 3:54
"A Winter's Day" (Impressions) – 5:11
"Morning Blend" (Sunday Morning Coffee) – 5:17
"Interlude I" (Fresh Aire Interludes) – 2:43
"Reggae Mañana Mon" (Party) – 2:12
"Prelude / Chocolate Fudge" (Fresh Aire) – 4:28
"Slo Dancin' in the Living Room" (Romance II) – 3:50

Disc 2
"The Pines of Rome" (Yellowstone: The Music of Nature) – 2:58
"Twilight at Rhodes" (Fresh Aire VI) – 1:59
"Zip-A-Dee-Doo-Dah" (Mannheim Steamroller Meets the Mouse) – 3:19
"The 7 Metals of Alchemy" (Fresh Aire 7) – 3:24
"Dancin' in the Stars" (Fresh Aire V) – 5:13
"Wassail, Wassail" (Mannheim Steamroller Christmas) – 2:22
"The Fourth Door" (Fresh Aire II) – 3:53
"Sonata Bach's Lunch" (Dinner) – 2:54
"The Holly & The Ivy" (A Fresh Aire Christmas) – 3:01
"Eclectic Blue" (Party 2) – 3:20
"Harp Seals" (Saving the Wildlife) – 1:38
"Kanbai" (Romance) – 4:08
"Ruslan and Ludmilla" (To Russia with Love) – 5:13

Mannheim Steamroller albums
1999 compilation albums
American Gramaphone compilation albums